The Time Machine series of science fiction stories for young adults, published between 1959 and 1989 in Boys' Life magazine, featured a group of American Boy Scouts who acquire an abandoned time machine. The Polaris Patrol visited the future and the past, sometimes recruiting new Scouts. The stories used the time machine as a framework for history lessons, but also explored the consequences of having a time machine (as well as the various technologies the boys who discovered it obtain from the future).

The author was given as Donald Keith for most of the stories, a pseudonym for the father-and-son team of Donald and Keith Monroe. In later years, some stories were credited just to the son, Keith Monroe.

The first story in the series was "The Day We Explored the Future", appearing in the December 1959 Boys' Life on page 18.

Some of the stories were collected in two books: Mutiny in the Time Machine and Time Machine to the Rescue, with Donald Keith listed as the author. All the Time Machine stories are available from Google Books in its collection of Boys' Life issues.

Recurring characters
 Bob Tucker, patrol leader (often the story narrator)
 Ellsworth "Brains" Baynes, brilliant bookworm who operates the Machine
 Kai Beezee Tentroy, recruited from a city called Troy in 4000 A.D.
 Dion, recruited from ancient Sparta
 Rodney Carver, an impetuous tenderfoot

Stories in Boys' Life
In the following table, "DK" indicates that the story's author is listed as Donald Keith, while "KM" means attribution to Keith Monroe. Links are to the copies available at Google Books.

See also

The Time Machine
The Disappearing Man and Other Mysteries
The Key Word and Other Mysteries

References

External links
 

Science fiction book series
Children's science fiction novels
Novels about time travel
Scouting in popular culture
Works originally published in Boys' Life